Spring Blossoms, Montclair, New Jersey is a late 19th-century painting by Scottish-American artist George Inness. The work is currently in the collection of the Metropolitan Museum of Art.

Done in oil and crayon (charcoal was also possibly used), the painting depicts Montclair, New Jersey in springtime. The style of Springtime is similar to paintings of the Hudson River School, by which Inness was influenced. 

The work is on view in the Metropolitan Museum's Gallery 770.

References 

1891 paintings
Paintings in the collection of the Metropolitan Museum of Art